The Free Church of Scotland has the following presbyteries and congregations:

Presbytery of Edinburgh and Perth

Presbytery of Glasgow and Argyll

Presbytery of Inverness, Lochaber and Ross

Kilmallie and Ardnamurchan Free Church
Kiltarlity Free Church
Kiltearn Free Church
Knockbain Free Church
Maryburgh and Killearnan Free Church
Ferintosh and Resolis Free Church
Smithton-Culloden and Nairn Free Church
Urray and Strathconon Free Church

Northern Presbytery

Presbytery of Skye and Wester Ross

Gairloch and Kinlochewe Free Church
Glenelg and Arnisdale, Lochalsh and Glenshiel Free Church
Trotternish Free Church
Lochbroom and Coigach Free Church
Lochcarron and Applecross Free Church
Plockton and Kyle Free Church
Poolewe and Aultbea Free Church
Portree Free Church
Raasay Free Church
Sleat and Strath Free Church

Western Isles Presbytery

Former churches

References

Scotland religion-related lists
Congregations
Free Church of Scotland